Aechmea is a genus of flowering plants in the family Bromeliaceae (subfamily Bromelioideae). The name comes from the Greek aichme, meaning "spear". Aechmea comprises eight subgenera and around 250 species distributed from Mexico through South America and the Caribbean. Most of the species in this genus are epiphytes.

Subgenera
Subgenera include:
 Aechmea subg. Aechmea Baker
 Aechmea subg. Chevaliera (Gaudichaud ex Beer) Baker
 Aechmea subg. Lamprococcus (Beer) Baker
 Aechmea subg. Macrochordion (De Vriese) Baker
 Aechmea subg. Ortgiesia (Regel) Mez
 Aechmea subg. Platyaechmea (Baker) Baker
 Aechmea subg. Podaechmea Mez
 Aechmea subg. Pothuava (Baker) Baker
 Aechmea subg. Streptocalyx ined.

Species
, Plants of the World Online listed the following species:

Transferred
Aechmea bicolor  → Wittmackia bicolor 
Aechmea burle-marxii  → Wittmackia burle-marxii 
Aechmea depressa  → Karawata depressa 
Aechmea gustavoi  → Karawata gustavoi 
Aechmea hostilis  → Karawata hostilis (E.Pereira) J.R.Maciel & G.M.Sousa
Aechmea involucrata  → Ronnbergia involucrata 
Aechmea multiflora  → Karawata multiflora 
Aechmea nigribracteata  → Karawata nigribracteata 
Aechmea prasinata  → Karawata prasinata 
Aechmea saxicola  → Karawata saxicola 
Aechmea tonduzii  → Ronnbergia tonduzii 
Aechmea turbinocalyx  → Wittmackia turbinocalyx 
Aechmea veitchii  → Ronnbergia veitchii

Cultivars
Cultivars include:
Aechmea 'Blue Tango'
Aechmea 'Burgundy'
Aechmea 'Fire'
Aechmea 'Gympie Gold'
Aechmea 'Jeanie'
Aechmea 'Malva'

References

 
Bromeliaceae genera
Taxa named by José Antonio Pavón Jiménez